Sensory neurons, also known as afferent neurons, are neurons in the nervous system, that convert a specific type of stimulus, via their receptors, into action potentials or graded potentials. This process is called sensory transduction. The cell bodies of the sensory neurons are located in the dorsal ganglia of the spinal cord.

The sensory information travels on the  afferent nerve fibers in a sensory nerve, to the brain via the spinal cord. The stimulus can come from exteroreceptors outside the body, for example those that detect light and sound, or from interoreceptors inside the body, for example those that are responsive to blood pressure or the sense of body position.

== Types and function ==
Different types of sensory neurons have different sensory receptors that respond to different kinds of stimuli. There are at least six external and two internal sensory receptors:

External receptors

External receptors that respond to stimuli from outside the body are called exteroreceptors. Exteroreceptors include olfactory receptors (smell), taste receptors, photoreceptors (vision), hair cells (hearing), thermoreceptors (temperature), and a number of different mechanoreceptors (stretch, distortion).

Smell 
The sensory neurons involved in smell are called olfactory sensory neurons. These neurons contain receptors, called olfactory receptors, that are activated by odor molecules in the air. The molecules in the air are detected by enlarged cilia and microvilli. These sensory neurons produce action potentials. Their axons form the olfactory nerve, and they synapse directly onto neurons in the cerebral cortex (olfactory bulb). They do not use the same route as other sensory systems, bypassing the brain stem and the thalamus. The neurons in the olfactory bulb that receive direct sensory nerve input, have connections to other parts of the olfactory system and many parts of the limbic system. 9.

Taste 
Similar to olfactory receptors, taste receptors (gustatory receptors) in taste buds interact with chemicals in food to produce an action potential.

Vision 
Photoreceptor cells are capable of phototransduction, a process which converts light (electromagnetic radiation) into electrical signals. These signals are refined and controlled by the interactions with other types of neurons in the retina. The five basic classes of neurons within the retina are photoreceptor cells, bipolar cells, ganglion cells, horizontal cells, and amacrine cells. The basic circuitry of the retina incorporates a three-neuron chain consisting of the photoreceptor (either a rod or cone), bipolar cell, and the ganglion cell. The first action potential occurs in the retinal ganglion cell. This pathway is the most direct way for transmitting visual information to the brain. There are three primary types of photoreceptors: Cones are photoreceptors that respond significantly to color.  In humans the three different types of cones correspond with a primary response to short wavelength (blue), medium wavelength (green), and long wavelength (yellow/red). Rods are photoreceptors that are very sensitive to the intensity of light, allowing for vision in dim lighting.  The concentrations and ratio of rods to cones is strongly correlated with whether an animal is diurnal or nocturnal.  In humans, rods outnumber cones by approximately 20:1, while in nocturnal animals, such as the tawny owl, the ratio is closer to 1000:1. Retinal ganglion cells are involved in the sympathetic response. Of the ~1.3 million ganglion cells present in the retina, 1-2% are believed to be photosensitive.

Issues and decay of sensory neurons associated with vision lead to disorders such as:
  Macular degeneration – degeneration of the central visual field due to either cellular debris or blood vessels accumulating between the retina and the choroid, thereby disturbing and/or destroying the complex interplay of neurons that are present there.
  Glaucoma – loss of retinal ganglion cells which causes some loss of vision to blindness.
  Diabetic retinopathy – poor blood sugar control due to diabetes damages the tiny blood vessels in the retina.

Auditory 
The auditory system is responsible for converting pressure waves generated by vibrating air molecules or sound into signals that can be interpreted by the brain.

This mechanoelectrical transduction is mediated with hair cells within the ear. Depending on the movement, the hair cell can either hyperpolarize or depolarize. When the movement is towards the tallest stereocilia, the Na+ cation channels open allowing Na+ to flow into cell and the resulting depolarization causes the Ca++ channels to open, thus releasing its neurotransmitter into the afferent auditory nerve. There are two types of hair cells: inner and outer. The inner hair cells are the sensory receptors .

Problems with sensory neurons associated with the auditory system leads to disorders such as:
 Auditory processing disorder – Auditory information in the brain is processed in an abnormal way. Patients with auditory processing disorder can usually gain the information normally, but their brain cannot process it properly, leading to hearing disability.
 Auditory verbal agnosia – Comprehension of speech is lost but hearing, speaking, reading, and writing ability is retained. This is caused by damage to the posterior superior temporal lobes, again not allowing the brain to process auditory input correctly.

Temperature 
Thermoreceptors are sensory receptors, which respond to varying temperatures. While the mechanisms through which these receptors operate is unclear, recent discoveries have shown that mammals have at least two distinct types of thermoreceptors.
The bulboid corpuscle, is a cutaneous receptor a cold-sensitive receptor, that detects cold temperatures. The other type is a warmth-sensitive receptor.

Mechanoreceptors 

Mechanoreceptors are sensory receptors which respond to mechanical forces, such as pressure or distortion.

Specialized sensory receptor cells called mechanoreceptors often encapsulate afferent fibers to help tune the afferent fibers to the different types of somatic stimulation. Mechanoreceptors also help lower thresholds for action potential generation in afferent fibers and thus make them more likely to fire in the presence of sensory stimulation.

Some types of mechanoreceptors fire action potentials when their membranes are physically stretched.

Proprioceptors are another type of mechanoreceptors which literally means "receptors for self". These receptors provide spatial information about limbs and other body parts.

Nociceptors are responsible for processing pain and temperature changes. The burning pain and irritation experienced after eating a chili pepper (due to its main ingredient, capsaicin), the cold sensation experienced after ingesting a chemical such as menthol or icillin, as well as the common sensation of pain are all a result of neurons with these receptors.

Problems with mechanoreceptors lead to disorders such as:
 Neuropathic pain - a severe pain condition resulting from a damaged sensory nerve 
 Hyperalgesia - an increased sensitivity to pain caused by sensory ion channel, TRPM8, which is typically responds to temperatures between 23 and 26 degrees, and provides the cooling sensation associated with menthol and icillin 
 Phantom limb syndrome - a sensory system disorder where pain or movement is experienced in a limb that does not exist

Internal receptors
Internal receptors that respond to changes inside the body are known as interoceptors.

Blood 
The aortic bodies and carotid bodies contain clusters of glomus cells – peripheral chemoreceptors that detect changes in chemical properties in the blood such as oxygen concentration. These receptors are polymodal responding to a number of different stimuli.

Nociceptors 
Nociceptors respond to potentially damaging stimuli by sending signals to the spinal cord and brain. This process, called nociception, usually causes the perception of pain. They are found in internal organs as well as on the surface of the body to "detect and protect". Nociceptors detect different kinds of noxious stimuli indicating potential for damage, then initiate neural responses to withdraw from the stimulus. 
 Thermal nociceptors are activated by noxious heat or cold at various temperatures.  
 Mechanical nociceptors respond to excess pressure or mechanical deformation, such as a pinch.
 Chemical nociceptors respond to a wide variety of chemicals, some of which signal a response. They are involved in the detection of some spices in food, such as the pungent ingredients in Brassica and Allium plants, which target the sensory neural receptor to produce acute pain and subsequent pain hypersensitivity.

Connection with the central nervous system 
Information coming from the sensory neurons in the head enters the central nervous system (CNS) through cranial nerves. Information from the sensory neurons below the head enters the spinal cord and passes towards the brain through the 31 spinal nerves. The sensory information traveling through the spinal cord follows well-defined pathways. The nervous system codes the differences among the sensations in terms of which cells are active.

Classification

Adequate stimulus 
A sensory receptor's adequate stimulus is the stimulus modality for which it possesses the adequate sensory transduction apparatus. Adequate stimulus can be used to classify sensory receptors:
 Baroreceptors respond to pressure in blood vessels
 Chemoreceptors respond to chemical stimuli
 Electromagnetic radiation receptors respond to electromagnetic radiation
 Infrared receptors respond to infrared radiation
 Photoreceptors respond to visible light
 Ultraviolet receptors respond to ultraviolet radiation 
 Electroreceptors respond to electric fields
 Ampullae of Lorenzini respond to electric fields, salinity,  and to temperature, but function primarily as electroreceptors
 Hydroreceptors respond to changes in humidity
 Magnetoreceptors respond to magnetic fields
 Mechanoreceptors respond to mechanical stress or mechanical strain
 Nociceptors respond to damage, or threat of damage, to body tissues, leading (often but not always) to pain perception
 Osmoreceptors respond to the osmolarity of fluids (such as in the hypothalamus)
 Proprioceptors provide the sense of position
 Thermoreceptors respond to temperature, either heat, cold or both

Location 
Sensory receptors can be classified by location:
 Cutaneous receptors are sensory receptors found in the dermis or epidermis.
 Muscle spindles contain mechanoreceptors that detect stretch in muscles.

Morphology 
Somatic sensory receptors near the surface of the skin can usually be divided into two groups based on morphology:
 Free nerve endings characterize the nociceptors and thermoreceptors and are called thus because the terminal branches of the neuron are unmyelinated and spread throughout the dermis and epidermis.
 Encapsulated receptors consist of the remaining types of cutaneous receptors.  Encapsulation exists for specialized functioning.

Rate of adaptation 
 A tonic receptor is a sensory receptor that adapts slowly to a stimulus and continues to produce action potentials over the duration of the stimulus. In this way it conveys information about the duration of the stimulus. Some tonic receptors are permanently active and indicate a background level. Examples of such tonic receptors are pain receptors, joint capsule, and muscle spindle.
 A phasic receptor is a sensory receptor that adapts rapidly to a stimulus. The response of the cell diminishes very quickly and then stops. It does not provide information on the duration of the stimulus; instead some of them convey information on rapid changes in stimulus intensity and rate. An example of a phasic receptor is the Pacinian corpuscle.

Drugs
There are many drugs currently on the market that are used to manipulate or treat sensory system disorders. For instance, Gabapentin is a drug that is used to treat neuropathic pain by interacting with one of the voltage-dependent calcium channels present on non-receptive neurons. Some drugs may be used to combat other health problems, but can have unintended side effects on the sensory system. Ototoxic drugs are drugs which affect the cochlea through the use of  a toxin like aminoglycoside antibiotics, which poison hair cells. Through the use of these toxins, the K+ pumping hair cells cease their function. Thus, the energy generated by the endocochlear potential which drives the auditory signal transduction process is lost, leading to hearing loss.

Neuroplasticity
Ever since scientists observed cortical remapping in the brain of Taub's Silver Spring monkeys, there has been a large amount of research into sensory system plasticity. Huge strides have been made in treating disorders of the sensory system. Techniques such as constraint-induced movement therapy developed by Taub have helped patients with paralyzed limbs regain use of their limbs by forcing the sensory system to grow new neural pathways. Phantom limb syndrome is a sensory system disorder in which amputees perceive that their amputated limb still exists and they may still be experiencing pain in it. The mirror box developed by V.S. Ramachandran, has enabled patients with phantom limb syndrome to relieve the perception of paralyzed or painful phantom limbs. It is a simple device which uses a mirror in a box to create an illusion in which the sensory system perceives that it is seeing two hands instead of one, therefore allowing the sensory system to control the "phantom limb". By doing this, the sensory system can gradually get acclimated to the amputated limb, and thus alleviate this syndrome.

Other animals
Hydrodynamic reception is a form of mechanoreception used in a range of animal species.

Additional images

See also

 Sensory nerve
 Pseudounipolar neuron
 Efferent nerve
 Neural coding
 Posterior column
 Receptive field
 Sensory system

References

External links

The major classes of somatic sensory receptors

Afferent neurons
Human cells
Sensory receptors
Receptor cells